State Highway 63 (SH 63) is a highway in east Texas that runs from Zavalla through Jasper, continuing east to the Louisiana border.

History
The highway was originally designated on August 21, 1923 along the easternmost branch of previously numbered SH 7 from Zavalla southeast to Bon Wier. On September 26, 1939, the section from Jasper to Bon Wier was transferred to U.S. Highway 190, while SH 63 was rerouted northeast to the Louisiana border via Burkeville, replacing part of SH 45. This is its current routing.

Major intersections

References

063
Transportation in Angelina County, Texas
Transportation in Jasper County, Texas
Transportation in Newton County, Texas